Okokhuo Village is a community located in Ovia North East Local Government Area of Edo State, Nigeria. It is among several Villages in Ovia North East Local Government Area that have suffered continuous herders` attack resulting in loss of properties.

See also 
 Ovia North East
 Edo people

References 

Populated places in Edo State